Aleksandr Sergeyevich Sergeyev (28 August 1897, Serpukhov – 24 January 1970, Moscow) was a Russian chess master.

He won the Moscow City Chess Championship in 1925. In other editions of the same event, he tied for 3rd-5th in 1922/23 (Nikolai Grigoriev won), took 6th in 1924 (Grigoriev won), took 7th in 1926 (Abram Rabinovich won), tied for 5-6th in 1927 (Nikolai Zubarev, won), tied for 3rd-4th in 1928 (Boris Verlinsky won), took 17th in 1930 (Zubarev won), took 19th in 1933/34 (Nikolai Riumin won), and tied for 10-12th in 1935 (Riumin won).

Participating on three occasions at the USSR Chess Championship, he tied for 16-17th at Moscow 1924 (Efim Bogoljubow won), tied for 9-10th at Leningrad 1925 (Bogoljubow won), and took 13th at Moscow 1927 (Fedor Bogatyrchuk and Peter Romanovsky won).

References

External links 

1897 births
1970 deaths
Russian chess players
20th-century chess players